Denis Naughten (born 23 June 1973) is an Irish Independent politician who has been a Teachta Dála (TD) for the Roscommon–Galway constituency since 2016, and previously from 2007 to 2016 for the Roscommon–South Leitrim constituency and from 1997 to 2007 for the Longford–Roscommon constituency. He was appointed Chair of the Committee on Social Protection, Community and Rural Development and the Islands in September 2020. He previously served as Minister for Communications, Climate Action and Environment from 2016 to 2018. He was a Senator for the Agricultural Panel from January 1997 to June 1997.
 
He sits as an Independent TD, having lost the Fine Gael parliamentary party whip in July 2011.

Family and early life
Naughten was born in Drum, County Roscommon, in 1973. He was educated at St. Aloysius College, Athlone, University College Dublin and University College Cork, where he studied for a PhD in Food Microbiology (extracellular polysaccharide production in lactic acid bacteria), but did not complete it. His father Liam Naughten was also a Fine Gael TD and Senator.

Political career
Naughten was elected at a by-election to Seanad Éireann in 1997, to the seat vacant since the death of his father. Following, the 1997 general election, he was elected to Dáil Éireann as a Fine Gael TD for the Longford–Roscommon constituency and was re-elected at the 2002 general election. He was also a member of Roscommon County Council and the Western Health Board from January 1997 to October 2003.

Within his first few weeks in the Dáil, he became Fine Gael Spokesperson on Youth Affairs, School Transport and Adult Education. Between 2000 and 2001, he served as Spokesperson on Enterprise, Trade and Employment. Naughten declined to stand in the party's leadership election in 2002, having at first indicated an interest in standing. He was later appointed Spokesperson on Transport. He was Spokesperson on Agriculture from 2004 to 2007.

He was re-elected at the 2007 general election for the new constituency of Roscommon–South Leitrim. He was Spokesperson on Immigration and Integration from 2007 to 2010. In June 2010, he supported Richard Bruton's leadership challenge to Enda Kenny. Following Kenny's victory in a motion of confidence, Naughten was not re-appointed to the front bench. In October 2010, he was appointed Deputy Spokesperson on Health, with special responsibility for Primary Care and Disability.

He was re-elected at the 2011 general election. He voted against the government's decision to close the Roscommon County Hospital emergency department on 6 July 2011. He lost the Fine Gael party whip the following day. On 13 September 2013, he and six other expellees formed the Reform Alliance, described as a "loose alliance" rather than a political party. He was re-elected for Roscommon–Galway at the 2016 general election.

Naughten was appointed as Minister for Communications, Climate Action and Environment in Taoiseach Enda Kenny's Fine Gael/Independent minority government after two months of negotiation following the 2016 general election. He later resigned from this post on 11 October 2018, following controversy surrounding a series of meetings he attended with the leading bidder for his department's National Broadband Plan that occurred during the project's procurement process. He was replaced by Richard Bruton. He stood for election for Ceann Comhairle at the first sitting of the 33rd Dáil on 20 February 2020, but was defeated by Seán Ó Fearghaíl. Naughten was subsequently appointed by Leo Varadkar as the Leas-Cheann Comhairle on an acting basis due to a deferred election caused by the COVID-19 pandemic.

On 13 February 2023, he announced that he would not be contesting the next general election.

See also
Families in the Oireachtas

References

External links

 

1973 births
Living people
Alumni of University College Cork
Alumni of University College Dublin
Fine Gael TDs
Independent TDs
Local councillors in County Roscommon
Members of the 20th Seanad
Members of the 28th Dáil
Members of the 29th Dáil
Members of the 30th Dáil
Members of the 31st Dáil
Members of the 32nd Dáil
Members of the 33rd Dáil
Fine Gael senators
Ministers for the Environment (Ireland)